Shetpe (Шетпе, شەتپە) is a selo and the administrative center of Mangystau District in Mangystau Region in western Kazakhstan. Population:

Climate
Shetpe has a cold desert climate (Köppen climate classification BWk).

References

Populated places on the Caspian Sea
Populated places in Mangystau Region